Another Man's Wife is a 1924 American silent drama film directed by Bruce Mitchell and starring James Kirkwood, Lila Lee and Wallace Beery. The story takes part in a ship off Mazatlán in Mexico.

Cast
 James Kirkwood as John Brand
 Lila Lee as Helen Brand
 Wallace Beery as 	Captain Wolf
 Matt Moore as 	Phillip Cochran
 Zena Keefe as 	Dancer
 Chester Conklin as Rumrunner
 Kate Price		
 Ralph Yearsley	
 Donald MacDonald

References

Bibliography
 Connelly, Robert B. The Silents: Silent Feature Films, 1910-36, Volume 40, Issue 2. December Press, 1998.
 Munden, Kenneth White. The American Film Institute Catalog of Motion Pictures Produced in the United States, Part 1. University of California Press, 1997.

External links
 

1924 films
1924 drama films
1920s English-language films
American silent feature films
Silent American drama films
American black-and-white films
Films directed by Bruce M. Mitchell
Producers Distributing Corporation films
Seafaring films
Films set in Mexico
1920s American films
Silent adventure films